Philip Jennings may refer to:

 Philip Jennings (The Americans), fictional character in the 2010s American television drama series The Americans
 Philip Jennings (Queenborough MP) (c. 1679–1740), English lawyer and politician, MP for Queenborough 1715–22
 Sir Philip Jennings-Clerke, 1st Baronet (c. 1722–1788), known as Philip Jennings until the 1760s, MP for Totnes 1768–88
 Philip Jennings (priest) (1783–1849), Archdeacon of Norfolk
 Philip Jennings (trade unionist) (born 1953), former Welsh trade union leader

See also 
 Jennings